Kyle Reginaid Adnam (born 18 November 1993) is an Australian professional basketball player for the Wellington Saints of the New Zealand National Basketball League (NZNBL).

Early life
Adnam was born and raised in the Melbourne suburb of Lilydale. He played junior basketball for the Mt. Evelyn Meteors. In 2013, Adnam played in the Victorian Youth Championship (VYC) for the Kilsyth Cobras, a season which culminated in him scoring 37 points in the VYC Grand Final, to lead the Cobras to victory. He subsequently earned VYC All-Star Five honours and was named the league MVP. In 24 games for the Cobras in 2013, he averaged 17.7 points, 5.0 rebounds, 4.1 assists and 1.4 steals per game.

Professional career

NBL
For the 2013–14 NBL season, Adnam joined the Adelaide 36ers as a development player. He appeared in three games for the 36ers in 2013–14, scoring a total of four points. He continued on as a development player in the 2014–15 NBL season with the Wollongong Hawks. He appeared in six games for the Hawks in 2014–15, scoring a total of eight points.

Adnam was a development player for a third season in 2015–16 with Melbourne United. On 12 February 2016, he scored a team-high 16 points in 28 minutes off the bench in a 100–63 loss to the New Zealand Breakers. He appeared in eight games for United in 2015–16, averaging 2.3 points per game. Adnam re-joined Melbourne United as a development player for the 2016–17 NBL season. On 4 November 2016, he scored a team-high 19 points off the bench in a 98–92 overtime loss to the Breakers. He appeared in 20 games for United in 2016–17, averaging 3.6 points and 1.2 assists per game.

For the 2017–18 NBL season, Adnam was elevated to United's full-time roster. On 14 October 2017, he scored a career-high 23 points with six 3-pointers in a 99–79 win over the Adelaide 36ers. He helped United win the 2018 NBL championship and averaged 3.5 points per game in 30 games.

After attending an NBA mini-camp run by the Dallas Mavericks during the 2018 off-season, Adnam joined the Sydney Kings for the 2018–19 NBL season. The Kings finished the regular season in third place with an 18–10 record before losing 2–0 to Melbourne United in the semi-finals, despite Adnam's equal team-high 13 points off the bench in game two. He appeared in all 30 games for the Kings in 2018–19, averaging 6.7 points, 1.1 rebounds and 1.3 assists per game.

For the 2019–20 NBL season, Adnam joined the inaugural roster of the South East Melbourne Phoenix. He averaged career highs across the board and played every game the season had to offer.

For the 2020–21 NBL season, Adnam was named co-captain of the Phoenix and helped them reach the semi-finals. He set another career-best season averaging 12.6 points and 3.6 assists. In March 2021, he scored a then career-high 28 points.

On 22 June 2021, Adnam re-signed with the Phoenix on a two-year deal.

On 1 October 2022, Adnam scored a career-high 30 points in an 84–79 win over the Tasmania JackJumpers.

Off-season stints
Adnam played for the Kilsyth Cobras of the SEABL in 2014, 2015 and 2016. He was named SEABL Youth Player of the Year in 2014 and 2015, as well as All-SEABL Team in 2015.

In 2017, Adnam played for the Nelson Giants of the New Zealand NBL. He suffered toe and quad muscle injuries during the season. In 11 games, he averaged 16.6 points, 2.5 rebounds and 4.6 assists per game.

Adnam returned to the Nelson Giants for the 2018 New Zealand NBL season. In 18 games, he averaged 19.2 points, 2.8 rebounds, 5.7 assists and 2.1 steals per game.

In 2022, Adnam played in Canada for the Fraser Valley Bandits of the CEBL.

On 28 February 2023, Adnam signed with the Wellington Saints for the 2023 New Zealand NBL season.

National team career
In June 2017, Adnam was selected in the Australian Emerging Boomers squad for the Summer Universiade in Taipei.

Personal life
Adnam's younger brother, Jorden, has also played for the Kilsyth Cobras.

As of August 2020, Adnam is studying a Bachelor of Business (Sports Management) at Deakin University.

References

External links
NBL player profile
Kilsyth Cobras player profile
SEABL stats
"Australian import Adnam ignites a spark in debut appearance for Nelson Giants" at stuff.co.nz

1993 births
Living people
Adelaide 36ers players
Australian men's basketball players
Basketball players from Melbourne
Melbourne United players
Nelson Giants players
Point guards
South East Melbourne Phoenix players
Sydney Kings players
Wollongong Hawks players